Bisaltes bimaculatus is a species of beetle in the family Cerambycidae. It was described by Per Olof Christopher Aurivillius in 1904.

References

bimaculatus
Beetles described in 1904